Anton Krijgsman (5 May 1898 – 1 May 1974) was a Dutch cyclist. He competed in the men's 50km event at the 1920 Summer Olympics.

See also
 List of Dutch Olympic cyclists

References

External links
 

1898 births
1974 deaths
Dutch male cyclists
Olympic cyclists of the Netherlands
Cyclists at the 1920 Summer Olympics
Cyclists from The Hague
20th-century Dutch people